Yang Shanfeng (born 8 January 1966) is a Chinese sailor. He competed in the men's 470 event at the 1988 Summer Olympics.

References

External links
 

1966 births
Living people
Chinese male sailors (sport)
Olympic sailors of China
Sailors at the 1988 Summer Olympics – 470
Place of birth missing (living people)